Angels are a type of creature present in many mythologies.

Angel or Angels may refer to:

Places
 Angel (river), in North Rhine-Westphalia, Germany
 Angel, London, an area of London
 Angel tube station
 The Angel, Islington, a building from which it is named
 Angel City, Florida, a populated place
 Angel Falls, a waterfall in Venezuela
 Angel Hill, a mountain in Otsego County, New York
 Angel Island (California), in San Francisco Bay
 Angel Mounds, Indiana, a Native American complex of earthworks and a National Historic Landmark
 Angeln or Angel (Danish), a peninsula in Germany
 Angels Camp, California, formerly called Angels
 Los Angeles, translation from Spanish (lit. 'The Angels')

People
 Angel (given name)
 Angel (surname)

Stage name or nickname
 Angel (American singer) (born 1988), former member of No Secrets
 Angel (British musician) (born 1987), British hip hop singer-songwriter and rapper
 Ángel (Spanish singer), 1980s disco singer
 Angel, female professional wrestler from the Gorgeous Ladies of Wrestling
 Angel, ring name of Angel Medina (wrestler) (b. 1972)
 Angel Faith (born 1988), American singer and songwriter, stage name Angel
 Angel Melendez (Andre Melendez 1971–1996), a purported drug dealer murdered by his fellow Club Kids Michael Alig and Robert D. "Freeze" Riggs
Angel Garza, shortened to Angel, Mexican professional wrestler (b. 1992)

Art, entertainment, and media

Fictional entities
 Angel (Buffy the Vampire Slayer), a character from Buffy the Vampire Slayer and its spin-off Angel
 Angel (Dungeons & Dragons), a roleplaying game monster
 Angel (Evangelion), a race of divine beings in the Neon Genesis Evangelion series
 Angel (Thomas Halloway), a golden age superhero in Mavel (Timely) Comics
 Angel, played by Molly Hagan, a character on the TV sitcom Herman's Head
 Angel, a Lady and the Tramp II character
 Angel, a Lilo & Stitch character, also known as Experiment 624
 Angel, a character in My Little Pony: Friendship is Magic
 Angel, a Maximum Ride character
 Angel, a type of creature in the game Resistance: Fall of Man
 Angel, a Tekken character
 Angel, a The Big O character
 Ángel, a The King of Fighters character
 Angels, a group of Marvel Comics entities
 Angels, a group of revitalised zombies in Zom-B
 Hosmer Angel, an "A Case of Identity" character
 Angel Clare, a Tess of the d'Urbervilles character
 Avery "Angel" King, an Over There character
 Evelyn "Angel" Martin, a The Rockford Files character
 Angel O'Day, heroine of Angel and the Ape, a DC Comics title 
 Angel Parrish, a Home and Away character
 Angel Salvadore, an X-Men character first appearing in 2001
 Angel Dumott Schunard, a character in the musical Rent
 The Angels, a group of characters in Captain Scarlet and the Mysterons and in the 2005 remake Gerry Anderson's New Captain Scarlet
 Warren Worthington III, also known as Angel or Archangel, a founding member of the X-Men
 Weeping Angels, a race of aliens from the sci-fi series Doctor Who

Films
 Angel (1937 film), an American comedy drama by Ernst Lubitsch and starring Marlene Dietrich
 The Angel (1958 film), a Chinese film by Li Han-hsiang
 Angel (1966 film), an animated short
 Angel (1982 Greek film), a Greek film by Giorgos Katakouzinos
 Angel (1982 Irish film), an Irish drama by Neil Jordan
 The Angel (1982 film), a French film by Patrick Bokanowski
 Angel (1984 film), an American sexploitation film
 Angel (1987 film), a Hong Kong action film
 Angels (1990 film), a Spanish-Swiss drama by Jacob Berger
 The Angels (film), a 1991 Hong Kong film featuring Yukari Oshima
 Angel (2002 film), a pornographic film by David Aaron Clark
 Angel Rodriguez (film), an American TV film
 Angel (2007 film), a British drama by François Ozon
 Ángel (film), a 2007 Puerto Rican drama by Jacobo Morales
 The Angel (2007 film), a 2007 short film
 Angels (2007 film), a Filipino trilogy
 Angel (2009 film), a Norwegian drama
 Angel (2011 film), a Bollywood film
 Angels (2014 film), a Malayalam film
 Angel (2016 film), winner of several 2018 Magritte Awards
 Angel (2017 film), a Telugu film
 Un Ange, a Belgian film
 The Angel (2018 film), an Israeli-American spy thriller film
 El Angel (film), a 2018 Argentine film

Fine art
 Angel (Michelangelo), a sculpture in Italy
 Angels (statues), a group of busts in Slovenia
 El Ángel, a victory column in Mexico City
 The Angel (painting), a 2013 painting by Michaël Borremans

Gaming
 Angels Online, massively multiplayer online role-playing game
 Wrestle Angels, wrestling-based video game series
 Super Wrestle Angels

Literature
 Angel (novel), by Elizabeth Taylor
 Angel, a novel by Cliff McNish
 Angel: A Maximum Ride Novel, a novel by James Patterson
 Angel Burn, the first novel of the Angel trilogy by L.A. Weatherly
 Angel series, a series of western novels by Frederick Nolan writing as Daniel Rockfern
 Angels (novel), by Denis Johnson
 Angels: God's Secret Agents, a book by Billy Graham
 "The Angel" (fairy tale), by Hans Christian Andersen
 "The Angel" (Songs of Experience), a poem by William Blake

Manga
 Angel (manga), a hentai manga series by U-Jin
 Angel, a manga by Erica Sakurazawa

Music
 Angel (musical), a 1978 Broadway musical
 Angel Records, an American record label

Groups
 Angel (American band), 1975–present, an American rock band 
 Angel (British band), 1973–1974
 Angel (Swedish band), an early 1990s pop group
 Angel, a 1989 band headed by Criss Angel
 The Angels (American group), a girl group
 The Angels (Australian band), a hard rock band

Albums
 Angel (Gina Jeffreys album), 2001
 Angel (Amanda Perez album), or the title song, 2003
 Angel (Angel album), or the title song, 1975
 Angel: The Collection, a 2000 greatest-hits compilation by Angel
 Angel (Ohio Players album), or the title song, 1977
 The Angel, a 2004 album by Sol Invictus
 Angels (album), a 2006 album by the 69 Eyes, or the title song
 Angels E.P., a 1995 EP by Whiskeytown

Songs

 "An Angel", a song by The Kelly Family
 "Angel" (A-ha song)
 "Angel" (Aerosmith song)
 "Angel" (Akon song)
 "Angel" (Amanda Perez song)
 "Angel" (Angela Winbush song)
 "Angel" (Aretha Franklin song)
 "Ángel" (Belinda Peregrín song)
 "Angel" (Chiara song)
 "Angel" (Eurythmics song)
 "Angel" (Fifth Harmony song)
 "Ángel" (Follow That Dream song), song from the film Follow That Dream recorded by Elvis Presley and later by Cliff Richard
 "Angel" (Gina Jeffreys song)
 "Angel" (Goldie song)
 "Angel" (Helena Paparizou song)
 "Angel" (Jimi Hendrix song)
 "Angel" (JJ Cale song)
 "Angel" (Jon Secada song)
 "Angel" (Kate Voegele song)
 "Angel" (Kirsty MacColl song)
 "Angel" (Lionel Richie song)
 "Angel" (Lo-Tel song)
 "Angel" (Madonna song)
 "Angel" (Massive Attack song)
 "Angel" (Mika Newton song)
 "Angel" (Natasha Bedingfield song)
 "Angel" (Pharrell Williams song)
 "Angel" (Sarah McLachlan song)
 "Angel" (Shaggy song)
 "Angel" (Taher Shah song)
 "Angel" (The Corrs song)
 "Angel" (Tina Cousins song)
 "Angel" (Two Tricky song)
 "Angel" (Yoko Ono song)
 "Angels" (Amy Grant song)
 "Angels" (Chance the Rapper song)
 "Angels" (P-Money song)
 "Angels" (Robbie Williams song)
 "Angels" (The xx song)
 "Angels" (Within Temptation song)
 "Angels" (Michael W. Smith song)
 "The Angel" (song), by Bruce Springsteen
 "Angel" by 8mm, from the album Songs to Love and Die By
 "Angel" by Ala Boratyn, from the album Higher
 "Angel" by Amanda Perez, from the album Angel
 "Angel" by Anne Gadegaard, from the album Ini Mini Miny
 "Angel" by Anita Baker, from the album The Songstress
 "Angel" by Beverley Mitchell, from the album Beverley Mitchell
 "Angel" by Blue October, from the album Consent to Treatment
 "Angel" by Chaka Khan, from the album Funk This
 "Angel" by Chancellor
 "Angel" by Cody Simpson, from the album Coast to Coast
 "Angel" by Dave Matthews Band, from the album Everyday
 "Angel" by David Gates, from the album Never Let Her Go
 "Angel" by Depeche Mode, from the album Delta Machine
 "Angel" by Devin Townsend Project, from the album Epicloud
 "Angel" by DMX, from the album …And Then There Was X
 "Angel" by Dru Hill, from the album Enter the Dru
 "Angel" by Erasure, from the album Erasure
 "Angel" by Everything but the Girl, from the album Love Not Money
 "Angel" by EXO, from the album Mama
 "Angel" by Fleetwood Mac, from the album Tusk
 "Angel" by Flipsyde, from the album We the People
 "Angel" by Fra Lippo Lippi, from the album Light and Shade
 "Angel" by Golden Earring, from the album Face It
 "Angel" by Gothminster, from the album Gothic Electronic Anthems
 "Angel" by Gotthard, from their self-titled debut album "Angel" by Happy Mondays, from the album Yes Please! "Angel" by Jack Johnson, from the album Sleep Through the Static "Angel" by Judas Priest, from the album Angel of Retribution "Angel" by Kid Cudi, from the album Entergalactic "Angel" by Kings of Convenience, from the album Peace or Love "Angel" by Leona Lewis, from the album Spirit "Angel" by Lionel Richie, from the album Renaissance "Angel" by Marty Friedman, from the album Scenes "Angel" by Misia, from the album Ascension "Angel" by Monica, from the album Miss Thang "Angel" by Ne-Yo, from the album Because of You "Angel" by Nidji, from the album Breakthru' "Angel" by QueenAdreena, from the album Djin "Angel" by Riot, from the album Rock City "Angel" by Rod Stewart, from the album Never a Dull Moment "Angel" by Sarah Brightman, from the album Dreamchaser "Angel" by Stabbing Westward, from the album Stabbing Westward "Angel" by Theory of a Deadman, from the album Savages "Angel" by the Weeknd, from the album Beauty Behind the Madness "Angel (What in the World Come Over Us)" by Atlanta Rhythm Section, from the album Third Annual Pipe Dream "Ángel" by Mecano, from the album Entre el cielo y el suelo "Angel 07" by Hubert Kah, from the album Angel 07 "Angel (Footsteps)" by Jeff Beck, from the album Who Else! "The Angel" by Buffy Sainte-Marie, from the album Illuminations "The Angel" by Heavenly, from the album Sign of the Winner "The Angel" by Ministry, from the album Twitch "The Angel" by Richard Wagner, from the album Wesendonck Lieder "Angels" by ASAP Rocky, from the album LONG.LIVE.A$AP "Angels" by Avenged Sevenfold, from the album  The Stage "Angels" by Baboon, from the album We Sing and Play "Angels" by David Byrne, from his self-titled album
 "Angels" by Chance the Rapper, from the album Coloring Book "Angels" by Crass, from the album The Feeding of the 5000 "Angels" by Diddy, from the album Last Train to Paris "Angels" by Jessica Simpson, from the album In This Skin: Collector's Edition "Angels" by John Farnham, from the album Then Again "Angels" by Junkie XL, from the album Radio JXL: A Broadcast from the Computer Hell Cabin "Angels" by Khalid, from the album American Teen "Angels" by Limp Bizkit, from the album Gold Cobra "Angels" by Mayday Parade, from the album Monsters in the Closet "Angels" by MxPx, from the album Secret Weapon "Angels" by Nilüfer Yanya, from the album Miss Universe "Angels" by Owl City, from the album All Things Bright and Beautiful "Angels" by The Prom Kings, from the self-titled album
 "Angels" by The Tea Party, from the album The Interzone Mantras "Angels" by Threshold, from the album Clone "Angels" by Tori Amos, from the album Tales of a Librarian "Angels" by Warrant, from the album Born Again "Angels (Love is the Answer)" by Morandi, from the album N3XTTelevision
Television series
 Angel (1960 TV series), an American sitcom
 Angel (1999 TV series), a 1999–2004 supernatural drama spun off from Buffy the Vampire Slayer Angel (2007 TV series), a South Korean series retitled Lobbyist Angels (TV series), a 1975–1983 British drama
 The Angel (game show)Touched by an Angel, an American TV series starting Della Reese

Television episodes
 "Angel" (7th Heaven)
 "Angel" (Buffy the Vampire Slayer episode)
 "Angel" (Casualty)
 "Angel" (Law & Order)
 "Angel" (So Weird)
 "Angel" (The Bill)
 "Angel" (The Red Green Show)
 "Angel" (The Rookies)
 "Angel" (Wainy Days)
 "Angel" (Walker, Texas Ranger)
 "Angel" (The Wonder Years)
 "Angels" (Breeze Block)
 "Angels" (Law & Order: Special Victims Unit)

Brands and enterprises
 Angel (St. Paul's Churchyard), a historical bookseller in London
 Angel Incorporated, a telecommunications company
 Angel Studios, a video streaming service and media company
 Angel, a line of perfumes by Thierry Mugler
 Angel, a video game publisher (subsidiary of Bandai) whose games include Shatterhand''
 ANGEL Learning, a software company
 Angel Paintball Sports
 Angels (nightclub)
 Angels Costumes, a London-based company founded in 1840, which supplies costumes to the film, theatre and television industries, and to the general public

Sports
 Angel City FC, and American soccer team in Los Angeles
 Angels Toruń, a Polish American Football League team
 Angel Garza, Mexican professional wrestler
 BC Angels, Lingerie Football League team
 Los Angeles Angels, an American Major League Baseball team
 Pesaro Angels, an American football team in Italy
 Petro Gazz Angels, a Philippines women's volleyball team

Other uses
 Angel (coin)
 Angel (Manx coin)
 Angel (paintball gun)
 Angel investor, an early-stage investor
 Altitude (military aviation brevity code "Angels")
 Hells Angels, a motorcycle club
 Victoria's Secret Angels, the brand's most prominent contracted models

See also

 
 
 
 
 Angelic (disambiguation)
 Angela (disambiguation)
 Angèle, a given name
 Angeles (disambiguation)
 Angell (disambiguation)
 Angelle, a given name and surname
 Angelo (disambiguation)
 Anjali (disambiguation)
 Earth Angel (disambiguation)
 El Ángel (disambiguation)
 Engel (disambiguation)
 Fallen angel (disambiguation)
 Guardian angel (disambiguation)